is a 1981 Japanese film directed by Setsuo Nakayama.

Cast
 Katsuo Nakamura as Kimura
 Shūichi Suzuki as Hideo Nemoto
 Etsuko Ichihara
 Michiko Hayashi
 Rie Kimura
 Masami Horiuchi

Awards
5th Japan Academy Prize
Won: Best Supporting Actor - Katsuo Nakamura
6th Hochi Film Award
Won: Best Supporting Actor - Katsuo Nakamura

References

External links
 
 

1981 films
Films directed by Setsuo Nakayama
1980s Japanese films